Tohoku International School (TIS) is a coeducational international school located in Izumi-ku, Sendai, Japan. There are about 100 students from kindergarten (ages 4–5) to grade 12. TIS is accredited by the Western Association of Schools and Colleges (WASC). Tohoku International School's mission statement reads "A community of learners preparing for life in an evolving global society".

History 
The school was founded in 1950 as a school for the children of Christian missionary families. It was originally known as Sendai American School, though it changed its name to Sendai Christian Academy and then back to Sendai American School before finally renaming itself Tohoku International School in 1997. It is currently now applying to be part of the International Baccalaureate and appears to have a musical theater programme 

There are currently 95 students enrolled at Tohoku International School: 10 pre-school pupils, 47 primary school pupils, 24 secondary school pupils, and 14 pupils of unknown age.

References

External links

Tohoku International School

Elementary schools in Japan
High schools in Miyagi Prefecture
International schools in Japan
Education in Miyagi Prefecture
Buildings and structures in Sendai
Educational institutions established in 1950
1950 establishments in Japan